Kenda Rubber Industrial Company is a manufacturer of pneumatic tires in Taiwan since 1962 with manufacturing facilities in Taiwan, Mainland China, Vietnam, and Indonesia. They make tires for bicycles, motorcycles, ATVs, trailers, automobiles, and industrial equipment.

Kenda was the 27th largest tire maker in the world in 2010. In 2011, Kenda decided to sell the 50-percent share that it has in the $200 million joint venture that it started with Cooper Tire & Rubber Company in China in 2003.

Kenda is a sponsor of the Giant Asia Racing Team, a UCI Continental cycling team, and a national sponsor to National Multiple Sclerosis Society's MS 150. 
Company now supports (2013) Cleveland Cavaliers, Rockets, Cincinnati Reds and Columbus Blue Jackets.

See also
 List of companies of Taiwan
 List of tire companies

References

External links

 US headquarters website

1962 establishments in Taiwan
Cycle parts manufacturers
Automotive companies established in 1962
Taiwanese brands
Tire manufacturers of Taiwan